Jean Louis De Esque (1879-1956) was an author and poet. Several of his works were published under Connoisseur's Press in Jersey City, New Jersey. He also wrote under the pseudonym "Stewart."

Works
Betelguese, a trip through hell, (1908).
Silence: a compound problem novel, (1908).
The Flight of a Soul, (1908).
The Seasons and Other Poems, (1908).
A Count in the Fo'c'sle, (1932)

References

External links
 
 

1879 births
1956 deaths
American male poets
20th-century American poets
20th-century American male writers